Edward James Upson (born 21 November 1989) is an English professional footballer who plays as a midfielder for Stowmarket Town.

Upson has previously been capped for England at under-17 and under-19 level.

Club career

Ipswich Town
He scored the winning goal for Ipswich Town against Southampton in the FA Youth Cup final in 2005 when he was 15, and signed a professional contract at the age of 17. In 2008, he was loaned to Stevenage Borough, where he made one substitute appearance on 2 September against Kettering Town. He made his Ipswich debut as a substitute in a Football League Cup match at Shrewsbury Town on 11 August 2009. The match went to penalties after a 3–3 draw and Upson scored one of the penalties to help Ipswich through to the next round. After being scouted on many occasions by Barnet manager Ian Hendon, Upson joined the Bees on loan from 12 March 2010 for one month, and made his debut coming on as a second half sub for Albert Jarrett in the 1–1 home draw with Burton Albion. Upson was released by Ipswich at the end of the 2009–10 season.

Yeovil Town
He joined Yeovil Town on a two-year contract at the start of the 2010–11 season. He scored his first goal for Yeovil in the FA Cup match with Hartlepool United in 2010. On 13 August 2011, he scored his first league goal from outside the area in a 3–1 win over Oldham Athletic, and went one better with a strike from 30 yards to seal a 1–0 win against Wycombe Wanderers on 13 September 2011, this goal was later nominated for Mitre Goal of the Year. He also scored twice in the FA Cup, with goals in the 3–0 win over Hereford United, and the 2–2 draw with Fleetwood Town.

On 6 May 2013, Upson scored an 85th-minute goal in the 2013 Football League play-offs, to help Yeovil beat Sheffield United 2–1 on aggregate, to taking Yeovil to Wembley for the playoff final. A play-off final which they won 2–1 earning promotion to the Football League Championship for the first time in the club's history.

On 3 August 2013, Upson scored the winning goal as Yeovil won their first ever game in the Championship, to secure a 1–0 victory at Millwall.

Millwall
On 31 January 2014, Upson signed for Championship club, Millwall, for an undisclosed fee signing a two-and-a-half-year contract.

Milton Keynes Dons
On 3 June 2016, Milton Keynes Dons announced that Upson had signed a two-year deal with the club and would join the squad on 1 July 2016 following his release from fellow League One club Millwall.

On 16 August 2016, Upson scored his first goal for the club, scoring in the 94th minute in a 1–2 home defeat to Bradford City. On 26 November 2016, Upson scored twice in a 1–2 away win over Coventry City.

Bristol Rovers
On 22 May 2018, it was announced that Upson would leave recently relegated MK Dons and join Bristol Rovers effective from 1 July 2018 upon his contract ending at Milton Keynes. Upson made his debut for the club on the opening day of the season in a 2-1 defeat at Peterborough United and scored his first goal for the club on 28 August 2018, a consolation goal in the 87 minute of a 3-1 EFL Cup defeat to Queens Park Rangers. Upson went on to score one more goal in the 2018–19 season, bundling in a corner in a 2-0 victory over AFC Wimbledon. Upson's time at the club came to an end at the end of the 2020–21 season, a season that saw Rovers relegated to League Two bottom of the league.

Newport County
On 20 June 2021, it was announced that Upson had agreed a deal to join Newport County on a one-year deal, officially joining the club on 1 July 2021. He made his debut for Newport on 7 August 2021 in the starting line-up for the 1-0 League Two win against Oldham Athletic.

Stevenage
On 4 January 2022, Upson joined former loan club Stevenage on a deal until the end of the season.

Stowmarket Town
On 23 June 2022, Upson joined Stowmarket Town. Upson previously played for Stowmarket as a youngster.
On his 1st game of the season Upson scored a hatrick for the Gold and Blacks.

International career
Upson came on as a substitute for the England national under-19 team against Belarus in September 2007.

Career statistics

Honours
Ipswich Town
FA Youth Cup: 2004–05

Yeovil Town
Football League One play-offs: 2012–13

References

External links

1989 births
Living people
Sportspeople from Bury St Edmunds
English footballers
England youth international footballers
Association football midfielders
English Football League players
National League (English football) players
Ipswich Town F.C. players
Stevenage F.C. players
Barnet F.C. players
Yeovil Town F.C. players
Millwall F.C. players
Milton Keynes Dons F.C. players
Bristol Rovers F.C. players
Newport County A.F.C. players
Stowmarket Town F.C. players